WVQM (101.3 FM) is a commercial radio station in Augusta, Maine.  It simulcasts a talk radio format with 103.9 WVOM-FM in Bangor.  The stations are owned by Blueberry Broadcasting.  The radio studios and offices are on Target Industrial Circle in Bangor with additional studios at Community Drive in Augusta.

WVQM has an effective radiated power (ERP) of 41,000 watts.  The transmitter is on Winthrop Street in Hallowell, Maine.

Programming
Weekdays on WVQM and WVOM-FM begin with a local news and information show hosted by George Hale and Ric Tyler.  The rest of the weekday schedule is from nationally syndicated conservative talk shows:  Glenn Beck, Clay Travis & Buck Sexton, Howie Carr, Sean Hannity, "Ground Zero with Clyde Lewis" and "Coast to Coast AM with George Noory."

Weekends feature shows on health, money, technology, the outdoors, food, real estate, cars, senior citizens and repeats of weekday shows.  Weekend hosts include Kim Komando, "Somewhere in Time with Art Bell" and "The Car Doctor with Ron Ananian." WVQM and WVOM carry University of Maine Black Bears Football.  Most hours begin with world and national news from Fox News Radio.

History
In , the station signed on as WFAU-FM, the FM counterpart to WFAU 1340 AM (now WMDR).  It largely simulcast the AM's programming.

On July 5, 1982, the station changed its call sign to WKCG. Until 1999, WKCG played country music.  But that changed on March 1 when the station adopted the adult contemporary format vacated by then sister station WCTB. 

On January 5, 2009, the station dropped the Star 101 imaging and the adult contemporary format for a simulcast of talk radio WVOM. WCME  picked up the adult contemporary format and the Star imaging before switching several months later to a simulcast of WTOS-FM. In February 2009, WKCG switched call signs to WVQM, similar to its simulcast partner WVOM.

References

External links

VQM
Mass media in Kennebec County, Maine
News and talk radio stations in the United States
Radio stations established in 1961
Companies based in Augusta, Maine
Blueberry Broadcasting radio stations
1961 establishments in Maine